The Cierva C.6 was the sixth autogyro designed by engineer Juan de la Cierva, and the first one to travel a "major" distance.  Cierva, the engineer responsible for the invention of the autogyro, had spent all his funds on the research and creation of his first five prototypes. Therefore, in 1923, he turned to the Cuatro Vientos Aerodynamics Laboratory chief, Commander Emilio Herrera, who succeeded in persuading General Francisco Echagüe, the director of the Military Aviation Aeronautics Department, to take over the second stage in the research and development of Cierva's autogyros.

After several wind tunnel tests, Military Aviation built a Cierva C.6 autogyro in an Avro 504 frame. This machine, piloted by Captain Joaquín Loriga Taboada, made three flights, all of them in March 1924. One of those flights, the eight-minute trip from Cuatro Vientos airfield to Getafe airfield, was considered a giant step for Cierva's autogyros. 

The Cierva C.6 prototype was fitted with ailerons mounted on two small wings, also with elevators and a rudder. This complete three-axis control scheme was needed because the pilot had only limited control over the rotor. Only the front propeller was powered, so this aircraft could not hover, and could lose control at low speed. The vertical axis rotor spun freely; the faster the autogyro flew, the faster the rotor would spin and the greater lift it produced.

A replica of the Cierva C.6 was built to be shown in Murcia pavilion in Seville Expo '92 World's Fair. That replica can be now be seen in Museo del Aire (Spain), Cuatro Vientos, Madrid, Spain.

Variants
Cierva C.6 Prototype.
Cierva C.6A Powered by an  Le Rhône 9Ja rotary piston engine.
Cierva C.6B
Cierva C.6C Powered by a  Clerget 9B rotary piston engine. Built in the United Kingdom as Avro Type 574.
Cierva C.6D Powered by a  Clerget 9B rotary piston engine. Built in the United Kingdom as the Avro Type 575.

Specifications (C.6)

References

 Original pictures and data of this article were taken from "Museo del Aire", Cuatro Vientos, Madrid, Spain
 Cierva c.6 / Avro 574

See also

1920s Spanish experimental aircraft
Single-engined tractor autogyros
Aircraft first flown in 1924
Rotary-engined aircraft
C.6